In enzymology, a NMN nucleosidase is an enzyme that catalyzes the chemical reaction

nicotinamide D-ribonucleotide + H2O  D-ribose 5-phosphate + nicotinamide

Thus, the two substrates of this enzyme are nicotinamide D-ribonucleotide and H2O, whereas its two products are D-ribose 5-phosphate and nicotinamide.

This enzyme belongs to the family of hydrolases, specifically those glycosylases that hydrolyse N-glycosyl compounds.  The systematic name of this enzyme class is nicotinamide-nucleotide phosphoribohydrolase. Other names in common use include NMNase, nicotinamide mononucleotide nucleosidase, nicotinamide mononucleotidase, NMN glycohydrolase, and NMNGhase.  This enzyme participates in nicotinate and nicotinamide metabolism.

References

 

EC 3.2.2
Enzymes of unknown structure